Manilow is the eleventh studio album by singer-songwriter Barry Manilow released in 1985. It was his first album to miss the Top 40 and fail to earn a gold certification. Many feel it was due to the prominence of synthesizers, a departure from his renowned piano ballads. This album was one of  Manilow's only two albums with RCA Records.

The only other release with the RCA Company was a original soundtrack album of his 1985 CBS television movie, Copacabana, in which he starred as Tony Starr with Annette O'Toole as Lola Lamarr.

Release
Three singles released from this album are  "In Search of Love" (#11 US AC, #80 UK), "I'm Your Man" (#86 US, #96 UK), and "He Doesn't Care (But I Do)" (#22 US AC), with "I'm Your Man" becoming the only single from the album to reach the Billboard Hot 100 chart, peaking at number 86. However, "In Search of Love" and "He Doesn't Care (But I Do)" entered the Adult Contemporary chart, peaking at number 11 and 22 respectively. 

None of its singles' captured the general public except for the song "If You Were Here with Me Tonight" which became a mainstay in adult contemporary FM radio setlists.

Track listing

2007 US reissued version
Side 1
"I'm Your Man" (music: Barry Manilow, Howie Rice; lyrics: Allan Rich) – 4:53
"It's All Behind Us Now" (music: Barry Manilow, Howie Rice; lyrics: Allan Rich) – 4:08
"In Search of Love" (music: Barry Manilow, Howie Rice; lyrics: Allan Rich) – 4:08
"He Doesn't Care (But I Do)" (music: Kevin DiSimone; lyrics: Robin Grean) – 4:16
"Some Sweet Day" (music: Barry Manilow; lyrics: Adrienne Anderson) – 5:06

Side 2
"At the Dance" (music: Barry Manilow, Charles Fearing; lyrics: Adrienne Anderson) – 3:55
"If You Were Here with Me Tonight" (music: Eric Borenstein, Barry Manilow, lyrics: Eric Borenstein, Lisa Thomas) – 4:55
"Sweet Heaven (I'm in Love Again)" from the movie Copacabana (music: Barry Manilow; lyrics: Bruce Sussman, Jack Feldman) – 4:05
"Ain't Nothing Like the Real Thing" (Duet with Muffy Hendrix) (Nick Ashford, Valerie Simpson) – 3:13
"It's a Long Way Up" (John Annesi, Barry Manilow) – 3:30

French version
Side 1
"I'm Your Man" – 4:53
"It's All Behind Us Now" – 4:08
"In Search of Love" – 4:08
"He Doesn't Care But I Do" – 4:16
"Some Sweet Day" – 5:06

Side 2
"At the Dance" – 3:55
"If You Were Here With Me Tonight" – 4:55
"Sweet Heaven (I'm in Love Again)" – 4:05
"Don't Talk to Me of Love" (Duet with Mireille Mathieu) – 4:10
"It's a Long Way Up" – 3:30

Italian version
Side 1
"Amare Chi Si Manchi Tu (Who Needs To Dream)"
"I'm Your Man" – 4:53
"It's All Behind Us Now" – 4:08
"In Search of Love" – 4:08
"He Doesn't Care But I Do" – 4:16

Side 2
"Con Chi Sei (Some Sweet Day)" – 5:06
"At the Dance" – 3:55
"If You Were Here With Me Tonight" – 4:55
"Sweet Heaven (I'm In Love Again)" – 4:05
"It's a Long Way Up" – 3:30

Japanese Version
Side 1
"I'm Your Man" – 4:53
"It's All Behind Us Now" – 4:08
"In Search of Love" – 4:08
"He Doesn't Care But I Do" – 4:16
"Some Sweet Day" – 5:06
"Sakura"

Side 2
"At the Dance" – 3:55
"If You Were Here with Me Tonight" – 4:55
"Sweet Heaven (I'm in Love Again)" – 4:05
"Ain't Nothing Like the Real Thing" (Duet with Muffy Hendrix) – 3:13
"It's a Long Way Up" – 3:30
"In Search of Love" (Duet with Hideki Saijo)

Personnel
Barry Manilow - vocals, grand piano, keyboards, drums
John Pondel, Michael Landau - guitar
Howie Rice - guitar, bass, keyboards, drums
Neil Stubenhaus, Marc Levine, Will Lee, "Ready" Freddie Washington, Lequeint "Duke" Jobe - bass
Raymond Crossley - grand piano
John Philip Shenale - synthesizer
George Duke - Synclavier II
Randy Kerber - acoustic piano, Yamaha DX-8 synthesizer
Ron Pedley, Victor Vanacore, Kevin Jones, Jon Gilutin - keyboards
Kevin DiSimone - Linn drums, Yamaha grand piano, Yamaha DX-7 synthesizer, Roland Super Jupiter synthesizer, Synclavier
John Robinson, Rick Shlosser, Kerry Ashby - drums
Bud Harner - drums, drum programming
Peter Moshay - drum programming
Terral Santiel, Paulinho Da Costa - percussion
Joel Peskin - saxophone
Billie Hughes, Jason Scheff, Jon Lind, Luther Waters, Oren Waters, Barry Edward Hirschberg, James Jolis, Kevin DiSimone, Tom Kelly, Tommy Funderbunk, Bob Carlisle, Steve George - backing vocals
Barry Fasman, Howie Rice, Alan Foust - string arrangements

References

Barry Manilow albums
1985 albums
Albums produced by Ron Dante
RCA Records albums